The 2014–15 WHL season is the 49th season of the Western Hockey League (WHL). The regular season began on September 19, 2014 and ended on March 22, 2015.

The playoffs began on March 26, 2015, shortly after the end of the regular season, and ended on May 13, 2015; the winning team, the Kelowna Rockets, was awarded the Ed Chynoweth Cup and a berth in the 2015 Memorial Cup held at the Colisée Pepsi in Quebec City, Quebec.

Standings

Divisions: EA – East, CE – Central

x – Clinched Playoff spot, y – Clinched Division,  z- Clinched regular season title

bold – Clinched Playoff spot, y – Clinched Division,

Divisions: BC – B.C., US – U.S.

Statistical leaders

Scoring leaders 

Players are listed by points, then goals.

Note: GP = Games played; G = Goals; A = Assists; Pts. = Points; PIM = Penalty minutes

Goaltenders 

These are the goaltenders that lead the league in GAA that have played at least 1440 minutes.

Note: GP = Games played; Mins = Minutes played; W = Wins; L = Losses; OTL = Overtime losses; SOL = Shootout losses; SO = Shutouts; GAA = Goals against average; Sv% = Save percentage

2015 WHL playoffs

Conference Quarter-finals

Eastern Conference

(E1) Brandon Wheat Kings vs. (W2) Edmonton Oil Kings

(E2) Regina Pats  vs. (E3) Swift Current Broncos

(C1) Calgary Hitmen vs. (W1) Kootenay Ice

(C2) Medicine Hat Tigers vs (C3) Red Deer Rebels

Western Conference

(B1) Kelowna Rockets vs. (W2) Tri-City Americans

(B2) Victoria Royals vs. (B3) Prince George Cougars

(U1) Everett Silvertips vs. (W1) Spokane Chiefs

(U2) Portland Winterhawks vs. (U3) Seattle Thunderbirds

Conference Semi-finals

Eastern Conference

(E1) Brandon Wheat Kings vs. (E2) Regina Pats

(C1) Calgary Hitmen vs. (C2) Medicine Hat Tigers

Western Conference

(B1) Kelowna Rockets vs. (B2) Victoria Royals

(U1) Everett Silvertips vs. (U2) Portland Winterhawks

Conference Finals

Eastern Conference

(E1) Brandon Wheat Kings vs. (C1) Calgary Hitmen

Western Conference

(B1) Kelowna Rockets vs. (U2) Portland Winterhawks

WHL Championship

(E1) Brandon Wheat Kings vs. (B1) Kelowna Rockets

Playoff scoring leaders
Note: GP = Games played; G = Goals; A = Assists; Pts = Points; PIM = Penalty minutes

Playoff leading goaltenders
Note: GP = Games played; Mins = Minutes played; W = Wins; L = Losses; GA = Goals Allowed; SO = Shutouts; SV& = Save percentage; GAA = Goals against average

WHL awards

All-Star Teams

Eastern Conference

Western Conference

See also 
 2015 Memorial Cup
 List of WHL seasons
 2014–15 OHL season
 2014–15 QMJHL season
 2015 in ice hockey
 2014 in ice hockey

References

External links 

 Official website of the Western Hockey League
 Official website of the Canadian Hockey League
 Official website of the MasterCard Memorial Cup
 Official website of the Subway Super Series

Western Hockey League seasons
Whl
WHL